Štěpánka Hilgertová (née Prošková, born 10 April 1968 in Prague) is a former Czechoslovak-Czech slalom canoeist who competed at the international level from 1988 to 2017. Competing in six Summer Olympics, she won two gold medals in the K1 event, earning them in 1996 and 2000.

Hilgertová also won fourteen medals at the ICF Canoe Slalom World Championships with seven golds (K1: 1999, 2003; K1 team: 2003, 2005, 2010, 2013, 2015), five silvers (K1: 1997, K1 team: 1991, 2006, 2007, 2011), and two bronzes (K1: 2007, K1 team: 1989). The K1 team silver in 1991 and K1 team bronze in 1989 were with Czechoslovakia while the remaining medals were for the Czech Republic.

She won the overall World Cup title twice (1992 and 1998). She also won a total of 15 medals at the European Championships (7 golds, 5 silvers and 3 bronzes).

She announced her retirement from the professional sport in October 2017, at the age of 49. She did, however, state that she intends to continue competing as an amateur.

Her husband Luboš Hilgert is a former canoe slalom paddler and a multiple medalist from ICF Canoe Slalom World Championships. Their son Luboš is an active canoe slalom paddler as well. Amálie Hilgertová is her niece.

World Cup individual podiums

1 European Championship counting for World Cup points

References

External links
 
 
 
 

1968 births
Canoeists at the 1992 Summer Olympics
Canoeists at the 1996 Summer Olympics
Canoeists at the 2000 Summer Olympics
Canoeists at the 2004 Summer Olympics
Canoeists at the 2008 Summer Olympics
Canoeists at the 2012 Summer Olympics
Czech female canoeists
Czechoslovak female canoeists
Kayakers
Living people
Olympic canoeists of Czechoslovakia
Olympic canoeists of the Czech Republic
Olympic gold medalists for the Czech Republic
Canoeists from Prague
Olympic medalists in canoeing
Medalists at the 2000 Summer Olympics
Medalists at the 1996 Summer Olympics
Medalists at the ICF Canoe Slalom World Championships